Dasari Manohar Reddy is an Indian politician and member of the Telangana Legislative Assembly from the Peddapalli Constituency. He was first elected in 2014 then reelected in 2018. He was the founder of Trinity Educational Institutions.

References

Living people
Telangana MLAs 2014–2018
Telangana MLAs 2018–2023
Telangana Rashtra Samithi politicians
1955 births